VándorMások (lit. “Wandering/Roaming/Roving Others”) is one of the oldest gay organizations in Hungary. It has been organizing gay-friendly hikes in the mountains easily accessible from Budapest since December 26, 1991.

Features
Its leader and organizer has been “Gazsi” since the beginning. Its one-day hikes, equalling to an athletic achievement, take place once a month (except for several days’ hiking in the spring), with usually 20 or 30 people taking part. Its route has followed a four-year cycle since 1992, the individual hikes completing a continuous way, their start coinciding with the goal of the preceding one. The starting point of the four-year cycle is the brickyard at Pilisborosjenő, and the end is Budaörs. The difficulty of the hikes vary: the shortest being 9.5 km (5.9 mi) and the longest being 24.5 km (15.2 mi); sometimes there is opportunity for a shortcut. The smallest height difference is 190 m and the highest is 1040 m. The summer hikes are organised near the water so as to provide opportunity for bathing, and the December hike take place on Boxing Day and is followed by a birthday party.

Information on upcoming hikes can be found on the Internet, at the website of the gay sports organization of Hungary, Atlasz Sports Club. Hike details were also published in the LGBT magazines Mások and Labrisz and occasionally in some other, non-gay papers (such as Magyar Narancs). Apart from its route and the meeting place and time, information is available several months ahead about the expected costs, the distance, the height difference, and the arrival place and time.

Itinerary
Notes:
The letters A, B, C, D refer to subsequent years, A being 1992, 1996, 2000, 2004, 2008 etc.
English translations of the place names are given whenever the names are meaningful in Hungarian, so as to provide clues for the type of the venues as well as give insight into their history, scenery, or other associations in the folk tradition.

See also
Mások magazine

Resources
Routes of former hikes (a whole cycle)
Programmes for the year 2002
Programmes for the year 2003
Programmes for the year 2004

External links
The earlier, more extensive website of VándorMások (archived version) (in Hungarian, English, French, Czech, and German)
Information about current and forthcoming hikes (Hungarian)

LGBT culture in Hungary
Sport in Hungary
Hiking organizations